Schwarzer Graben may refer to:
Schwarzer Graben (Elbe), a river of Saxony, Germany, tributary of the Elbe
Schwarzer Graben (Glenne), a  river of North Rhine-Westphalia, Germany, tributary of the Glenne